Packington is a parish municipality in the Canadian province of Quebec, located in the Témiscouata Regional County Municipality in the Bas-Saint-Laurent region.

Demographics 

See also
Temiscouata Regional County Municipality
Branche à Jerry, a stream
Baker River North (Quebec-New Brunswick), au stream
List of parish municipalities in Quebec

References

External links
 

Parish municipalities in Quebec
Incorporated places in Bas-Saint-Laurent